Ranjan Daimary alias D.R. Nabla (Ransaigra Nabla Daimary) is the founder president of the armed separatist outfit National Democratic Front of Boroland. Daimary initially founded a militant group named Bodo Security Force in October 1986. Later, in 1994, Bodo Security Forced was renamed as National Democratic Front of Boroland.

Education
Ranjan Daimary belongs to an educated and rich family. Daimary's academic career is associated with noted school, college and university of Shillong, Meghalaya. Daimary completed his graduation in Political Science from St Anthony's College, and completed his Master's Degree in Political Science from North-Eastern Hill University (NEHU), Shillong, Meghalaya.

Family & secret killing of family
Ranjan Daimary's sister Lilawati Daimary, a school teacher, was killed by unidentified gunmen on 5 January 2010 that is widely believed as one of the incident of the Secret killings of Assam issue. Daimary's other sister Dr. Anjali Daimary is the chief of the Bodo Women Justice Forum.

Arrest
Ranjan Daimary was detained in Dhaka by Bangladesh Rifles (BDR) in December, 2009 and was later handed over to Border Security Force (BSF) authorities on 30 April 2010.
In reply to a habeas corpus petition filed by Daimary's sister Anjali Daimary, Gauhati High court Justice Ranjan Gogoi and Justice B P Katakey opined that the wife and children of Ranjan Daimary have not been handed over to them along with him by the Bangladesh Rifles.
Daimary's sister, Dr. Anjali Daimary, said to media that Ranjan Daimary would be ready for a lateral talk with the government, but not with a state as handcuffed.

Bail & release
Ranjan Daimary got bail on 11 April 2013 by the Session Judge of Gauhati in the cases against him including the 2008 Assam bombings case(case number Sessions Case No. 59 (K) of 2011).

Mr. Daimary was released on a parol of four weeks by order of the Gauhati High Court and flown to New Delhi to take part in the ongoing peace talks with Bodo Militants & Union of India.

Conviction
In January 2019, Ranjan Daimary and 13 others were convicted for 2008 Assam bombings. where Daimary and 9 others were sentenced to Life Imprisonment by the special court of the Central Bureau of Investigation (CBI).

See also
National Democratic Front of Boroland
National Democratic Front of Boroland (D.R. Nabla faction)
2008 Assam bombings

References

1960 births
North-Eastern Hill University alumni
Bodo nationalism
Bodo
Bodoland
People from Udalguri district
Living people
Insurgency in Northeast India